Glass Slippers was a 40-episode South Korean drama series that aired on SBS in 2002, starring Kim Hyun-joo and Kim Ji-ho as the two orphaned sisters.

Plot
6 year-old Yoon-hee and her elder sister Tae-hee were raised by their widowed father. Their mother had died giving birth to Yoon-hee. After years of struggles, their father who had already suffered from cancer was killed in a car accident, leaving the girls with no choice but to find their rich paternal grandfather who lost touch with them due to his disapproval of their mother. At the train station, they were robbed by a group of gangsters. Tae-hee, while chasing them, did not notice that Yoon-hee, who followed her, got knocked unconscious by the Oh family's truck. Tae-hee got beaten by the gangsters and was helped by a boy named Jae-hyuk until both got to see her grandfather. They looked for Yoon-hee in despair, unaware that she has lost her memories after regaining consciousness and moved away with the Ohs. Based on the name carved on her mother's ring, Yoon-hee assumed that her name was 'Sun-woo' and used it as her identity.

15 years later, Tae-hee works in her grandfather's company, and is romantically involved with her childhood crush and co-worker Jae-hyuk (unbeknownst to Tae-hee it was Jae-hyuk's revenge plan on her grandfather who had indirectly caused his grandfather's death years ago). In contrast, Sun-woo grows up in the Oh family and often gets abused (especially by Seung-hee). She almost gets raped by Seung-hee's step-father thus gets kicked out of the house by his wife. Seung-hee's crush Chul-woong has desires on Sun-woo, so he lets her take refuge at his home. Tae-hee, not giving up on finding her sister, tracks down the Oh's address and confronts Seung-hee upon seeing her wearing Sun-woo's ring. Quickly learned that Sun-woo is Tae-hee's long-lost sister, out of jealousy and greed, Seung-hee pretends to be Yoon-hee and moves in the Kim's family. Tae-hee seems happy while her grandfather remains suspicious of Seung-hee. He overhears Seung-hee's phone conversation with her mother and right away exposes her deceptive plan. However, Seung-hee lied that the real Yoon-hee's fate is unknown, not saying a word about Sun-woo. He is devastated thus decides to keep the truth from Tae-hee.

Coincidentally, Sun-woo gets a job in her grandfather's company and frequently interacts with Tae-hee and the grandfather. They are fond of Sun-woo until Jae-hyuk becomes so in love with her which breaks Tae-hee's heart. He aborts his revenge plan in order to run away with Sun-woo, but the grandfather soon finds out and sends him to prison for a few days before Tae-hee bails him out. Unable to forgive Tae-hee's grandfather, Jae-hyuk ends his relationship with Sun-woo and engages to Tae-hee. Sun-woo moves out on her own and subsequently becomes ill. She is diagnosed with leukemia, which can be cured only if her sibling or relative donates suitable bone marrow. As Sun-woo cannot remember any of them, she is ready to give up and spend her time left with Chul-woong. In the meantime, Tae-hee's grandfather assigns his chauffeur who is Chul-woong's father to find his real granddaughter. Being told by Seung-hee's step-father, Chul-woong's father informs that his missing granddaughter is indeed Sun-woo, who recently gets fired by him for the sake of Tae-hee and Jae-hyuk. In shock and regret, he rushes to see Sun-woo before the car accident kills him, as well as puts Chul-woong's father in a coma. Seung-hee bribes her step-father to keep secret, which makes him (and his wife) feel bad for Sun-woo. Jae-hyuk, who never stops loving Sun-woo, secretly covers her hospital bills while looking for evidence to expose Seung-hee. By chance, he meets Seung-hee's step father and is revealed the truth about her, which he tells Tae-hee right away. At this point, Sun-woo dreams about her father and the family's past moments. She wakes up as soon as Tae-hee arrives, the sisters share a long hug upon reunion. After kicks Seung-hee out of the house, Tae-hee donates her bone marrow for surgery to save Sun-woo. Sun-woo forgives the Ohs, but Seung-hee still holds grudge against her.

Sun-woo recovers well from the surgery. Jae-hyuk maintains a good companionship with Tae-hee while trying to get back with Sun-woo. Understanding her sister's feelings, Sun-woo rejects Jae-hyuk and accepts Chul-woong's marriage proposal. Before their wedding, Seung-hee orders a gang to kidnap Sun-woo. In order to protect her, Chul-woong fights against them and gets stabbed, thus dies in Sun-woo's arms and tears. Seung-hee is put to prison and still blames Sun-woo for having stolen her entire life from her. Jae-hyuk is taking a flight to U.S. Sun-woo, all of sudden, shows up at the airport and they share a brief farewell moment. Sun-woo and Tae-hee return to the house where they lived as children.

Cast
 Kim Hyun-joo as Kim Yoon-hee/Lee Sun-woo
Ha Seung-ri as young Yoon-hee
 Kim Ji-ho as Kim Tae-hee, Yoon-hee/Sun-woo's elder sister
Yoo Hae Won as young Tae-hee
 Han Jae-suk as Jang Jae-hyuk, Tae-hee's childhood crush and fiancé, Sun-woo's lover 
Choi Woo-hyuk as young Jae-hyuk
 So Ji-sub as Park Chul-woong, Seung-hee's crush, Sun-woo's admirer and later fiancé
 Kim Gyu-ri as Woo Seung-hee, the main villain
Park Eun-bin as young Seung-hee
 Kim Jung-hwa as Park Yeon-woong, Chul-woong's younger sister
 Baek Il-seob as Chairman Kim Pil-joong, Yoon-hee/Sun-woo and Tae-hee's grandfather
 Ha Jae-young as Kim Hyun Ho, Yoon-hee/Sun-woo and Tae Hee's father
 Kim Chung-ryeol as Yeon Seo-jeon, Yoon-hee/Sun-woo and Tae-hee's cousin
Shin Tae-hoon as young Seo-joon
 Lee Hee-do as Hwang Kuk-do, Seung-hee's stepfather
 Song Ok-sook as Oh Kim-sun, Seung-hee's mother
 Kim Chung as Suh Joon's mother
 Hyun Suk as Park Kwi Joong, Chairman Kim's chauffeur
 Son Young-joon as Oh Han Young, Jae Hyuk's assistant
 Lee Ki-young as Lee In Soo, Gangster leader
 Sung Dong-il as Mr. Can, Gangster leader's assistant
 Kim Hyung Jong as Soo Tak
 Seo Hyun Ki

Original soundtrack

CD 1:
 너의게로 가는 길– Kim Ji-woo
 고백 할게– Jia
 너를 지켜줄거야– Lee Jong-won (CAN)
 For Your Love – Jang Hye-jin
 Help Me Love – Park Wan-kyu
 비상지아– Park Wan-kyu
 Gloomy Sunday – Jeon Seung-woo & Park Chae-won
 서툰 고백 – Kim Jin-woo
 제발.. – Kim Jin-woo
 너를 지켜줄거야 (Piano Version)
 문 길 (Guitar Version)
 Tears (Piano Version)
 빈들에서 (Piano Version)
 너를 보낸 새벽 (Chorus Version)
 별 헤는 밤 (Harmonica Version)

CD 2:
 Nuh Wa Ham Gge (Piano Version)
 Yak Sok (Piano & Guitar Version)
 Pa Ran Mi So (Guitar Version)
 Nae Ahn Eh Nuh (Guitar Version)
 Do Shi Eh Ah Chim (Piano Version)
 Uh Rin Shi Jul (Piano Version)
 Mun Gil (Piano Version)
 Tears (Guitar Version)
 Nuh Reul Ji Kyuh Jool Gguh Ya (Violin Version)
 Nuh Wa Ham Gge (Guitar Version)
 Yak Sok (Piano Version)
 Byul He Neun Bam (Piano Version)
 Bin Deul Eh Suh (Guitar Version)
 Uh Rin Shi Jul (Piano Version)
 Sae Ro Oon Shi Jak (Guitar Version)
 Tears (Guitar Version)
 Pa Ran Mi So (Harmonica Version)
 Sae Ro Oon Shi Jak (E.Guitar Version)
 Uh Rin Shi Jul (Guitar Version)

International broadcast

Remake
In 2016 filmed remake "Threads of Destiny" studio FILM.UA quality rating Kinopoisk 7.084 out of 10.

Notes

See also
 List of South Korean television series
 Culture of South Korea

References

External links
  , official website
 Cineseoul profile

Seoul Broadcasting System television dramas
2002 South Korean television series debuts
2002 South Korean television series endings
Korean-language television shows
Television shows written by Kang Eun-kyung
South Korean melodrama television series
South Korean romance television series
Television series by Kim Jong-hak Production